H. Morse Stephens (October 3, 1857 – April 16, 1919) was an historian and professor of history at the University of California, Berkeley who helped to purchase the Bancroft Library, and who worked to build archives of California history, the 1906 San Francisco earthquake, and World War I.

Early life
Henry Morse Stephens (he generally went by his middle name) was born on October 3, 1857 in Edinburgh, Scotland. He was educated at Haileybury College, and attended Balliol College, Oxford University, where he was granted a B.A. in 1880 and an M.A. in 1892. He was a staff lecturer on the Oxford University Extension System from 1892–1894, and lecturer on Indian history at Cambridge, writing also for The Academy, The Daily Chronicle, The Speaker, and 'acting as London correspondent for The Statesman and the Calcutta Friend of India.'

Career as Professor of History, Dean, AHA member and President
Stephens immigrated to the United States in 1894 and took the position of Professor at Cornell University in the Department of History, where he taught European History. At Cornell, Stephens took a particular interest in advising undergraduates, starting two traditions which endured at Cornell for the next two decades: Thursday nights for upper classmen, and career conferences and advice to seniors as to their future professional careers. He was also an avid fundraiser for Cornell's athletic teams.

In 1902, Stephens went to the University of California as Professor of History and Director of University Extension, a position he held from 1902–1909. He served as Dean of the University of California College of Arts and Sciences from the fall of 1918 until his death. During his time at Berkeley, he worked to build the Bancroft Library's collection of historical materials, with special success in the area of Spanish and Mexican History, now known as the Bolton Collection.

Stephens was involved with the Bohemian Club and wrote the script for St. Patrick at Tara, the main Grove Play performed in 1909 at the Bohemian Grove. The play depicted Saint Patrick and his interaction with druids, chieftains and kings of Ireland.

Stephens was an active member of the American Historical Association serving as its President in 1915. His most notable contribution in the AHA, however, was as a member of the Committee of Seven, which in 1899 produced the report The Study of History in Schools for the AHA, and which influenced the teaching of history in American schools for the next 40 years.

Stephens Hall on the U.C. Berkeley campus is named for him, as was the Lodge of Free and Accepted Masons, chartered by the Grand Lodge of F. & A. Masons of California and Hawaii: Henry Morse Stephens #541, for which membership was open only to UC administrators, alumni, faculty and students. The lodge merged with other Berkeley, CA Lodges and is now part of Bay Cities Lodge #337, now in Richmond.

History of the San Francisco earthquake, World War I archives
After the 1906 San Francisco earthquake, at the suggestion University of California President Benjamin Ide Wheeler, Morse joined the Committee of 50, and in consultation with Governor Pardee, moved to the Earthquake History and Statistics Committee. As a member of this committee, he worked until his death to gather as many accounts and as much historical material as he could that was related to the earthquake. Morse collected over 800 individual accounts of the earthquake and fire as well as numerous newspaper articles, photographs, and other archival material. Unfortunately, after his death, the archive was never incorporated into the Bancroft library collection, as he had intended, and was lost in the 1920s, perhaps in a 1923 Berkeley fire.

When World War I broke out, Stephens began actively soliciting materials from around the world to document and formed a "Great War History Committee," work that was cut short by his death on April 16, 1919.

Bibliography
A history of the French revolution, by H. Morse Stephens, In three volumes. Vol. I–II. New York, C. Scribner's sons, 1886–91.
The principal speeches of the statesmen and orators of the French revolution, 1789–1795; ed. with introductions, notes, and indices, by H. Morse Stephens. 2 vols. Oxford, Clarendon Press, 1892.
The story of Portugal. New York, AMS Press 1971

Revolutionary Europe, 1789–1815, By H. Morse Stephens. London: Rivingtons, 1900, fifth edition
Sir Robert Peel, a memorial biography
Stephens, Henry Morse; Wallace Arthur Sabin, Charles Caldwell Dobie, Bohemian Club. St. Patrick at Tara, 1909 Grove play

Notes

External links

 
 
 AHA Reports: The Study of History in Schools(1898)_Committee of Seven: Table of Headings at www.historians.org Online index to The Committee of Seven Report.
 AHA Information: H. Morse Stephens Bibliography at www.historians.org Partial bibliography of H. Morse Stephens
  Essay by Stephens on History in "Counsel on the Reading of Books", edited by Henry van Dyke, American Society for the Extension of Teaching, 1900, as digitized by Google Books.
 The Directors at bancroft.berkeley.edu Online history of the Directors of the Bancroft library which describes Stephens' role in recruiting Herbert Eugene Bolton, the first Director.
 Selling the University a Library at bancroft.berkeley.edu Photo of Stephens and description of the importance of his role in purchasing the Bancroft Library.
 Guide to the H. Morse Stephens Papers at The Bancroft Library

1857 births
1919 deaths
Historians of the French Revolution
Scottish emigrants to the United States
Cornell University Department of History faculty
People educated at Haileybury and Imperial Service College
University of California, Berkeley faculty
Fellows of Balliol College, Oxford
Alumni of Balliol College, Oxford
Presidents of the American Historical Association
Historians from California